Peter Kieweg is an Austrian Paralympic athlete. He competed at both the 1984 Summer Paralympics and the 1984 Winter Paralympics.

In total, he won one bronze medal in athletics and two bronze medals in cross-country skiing.

References

External links 
 

Living people
Year of birth missing (living people)
Place of birth missing (living people)
Paralympic cross-country skiers of Austria
Cross-country skiers at the 1984 Winter Paralympics
Medalists at the 1984 Winter Paralympics
Medalists at the 1984 Summer Paralympics
Paralympic bronze medalists for Austria
Paralympic medalists in cross-country skiing
Athletes (track and field) at the 1984 Summer Paralympics
Paralympic medalists in athletics (track and field)
Austrian male shot putters
Austrian male cross-country skiers
Shot putters with limb difference
Paralympic shot putters
20th-century Austrian people